Legibus, dative and ablative plural for Latin lex (law), may refer to:

Literature
De Legibus a dialogue written by Marcus Tullius Cicero
De Legibus et Consuetudinibus Angliae, work by Henry de Bracton
De legibus naturae, work by Richard Cumberland (philosopher)
Tractatus of Glanvill (Tractatus de legibus et consuetudinibus regni Angliae)
Laws
Decemviri (also Decemviri Legibus Scribundis Consulari Imperio)

Phrases
Legibus solutus (sometimes princeps legibus solutus est); see above the law (disambiguation)

See also
Lex (disambiguation)
Leges (disambiguation)